Aphyocypris normalis is a species of cyprinid in the genus Aphyocypris that inhabits Vietnam.

References

Cyprinidae
Fish of Vietnam
Cyprinid fish of Asia